Poplar is a station on the Port Authority of Allegheny County's light rail network, located in Mount Lebanon, Pennsylvania. The street level stop is located in a densely populated residential area. Its primary purpose is to serve commuters within walking distance, providing access toward Downtown Pittsburgh, South Hills Village, or Library

References

External links 

Port Authority T Stations Listings
Station from Google Maps Street View

Port Authority of Allegheny County stations
Railway stations in the United States opened in 1987
Red Line (Pittsburgh)